The Neve 8048 is a mixing console designed by Neve Electronics, which features the 1081 mic preamp and equaliser, and the 2254 limiter/compressor. It has been used by artists such as 3 Doors Down, Alice in Chains, Cat Power, Death Cab for Cutie, Mother Love Bone, and Temple of the Dog.

The first Neve 8048 was exhibited at the AES Expo of 1974 in Denmark, and in subsequent years was used to record major albums by David Bowie, Led Zeppelin, Deep Purple and Queen. The 8048 was succeeded by further developments in the '80-series' of consoles including the 8058, 8068, 8078 and 8108.

References

Mixing consoles